Telitoxicum is a genus of flowering plants belonging to the family Menispermaceae.

Its native range is Colombia, Ecuador, French Guiana, Guyana, North Region, Brazil, Northeast Region, Brazil, Peru, Southeast Region, Brazil, Suriname, and Venezuela.

Species:

Telitoxicum duckei 
Telitoxicum glaziovii 
Telitoxicum inopinatum 
Telitoxicum krukovii 
Telitoxicum minutiflorum 
Telitoxicum negroense 
Telitoxicum peruvianum 
Telitoxicum rodriguesii

References

Menispermaceae
Menispermaceae genera